Assil Jaziri (born 3 August 1999) is a Tunisian professional footballer who plays as a forward for OGC Nice.

Club career
Jaziri made his professional debut for OGC Nice in a 1–0 Ligue 1 win over Dijon FCO on 31 March 2019.

International career
Jaziri debuted for the Tunisia U21 in a friendly 2–0 loss to the Italy U21s on 15 October 2018.

He made his debut for Tunisia national football team on 7 June 2019 in a friendly against Iraq, as a 71st-minute substitute for Bassem Srarfi.

References

External links
 
 OGC Nice Profile
 
 

1999 births
Living people
Association football forwards
Tunisian footballers
Tunisia under-23 international footballers
Tunisia international footballers
OGC Nice players
Ligue 1 players
Championnat National 2 players
Tunisian expatriate footballers
Tunisian expatriates in France
Expatriate footballers in France